Brian Lockwood (8 October 1946) is an English World Cup winning former professional rugby league footballer who played in the 1960s, 1970s and 1980s, and coached in the 1980s.

Background
Brian Lockwood was the landlord of The Bay Horse, Methley, The Boat, Allerton Bywater, and The Sun Inn, 719 Leeds Road, Lofthouse Gate, Wakefield .

Playing career

International honours
Brian Lockwood won caps for England while at Castleford in 1970 against France (sub), and while at Hull Kingston Rovers in 1979 against Wales, and France, and won caps for Great Britain while at Castleford in the 1972 Rugby League World Cup against Australia (2 matches), France, and New Zealand, in 1973 against Australia (2 matches), in 1974 against France, while at Hull Kingston Rovers in 1978 against Australia, and in 1979 New Zealand (sub).

County honours
Brian Lockwood won caps for Yorkshire while at Castleford playing left-, i.e. number 11, in the 12–14 defeat by Lancashire at Salford's stadium on 3 September 1969, playing left- in the 15–21 defeat by Cumberland at Whitehaven's stadium on 14 September 1970, as a substitute in the 32–12 victory over Lancashire at Castleford's stadium on 13 January 1971, playing left- in the 34–8 victory over Lancashire at Castleford's stadium on 24 February 1971, playing left- in the 32–18 victory over Lancashire at Castleford's stadium on 11 October 1972, and left- in the 20-7 victory over Lancashire at Leeds' stadium on 17 January 1973.

Challenge Cup Final appearances
Brian Lockwood played right-, i.e. number 12, in Castleford’s 11-6 victory over Salford in the 1968–69 Challenge Cup Final during the 1968–69 season at Wembley Stadium, London on Saturday 17 May 1969, in front of a crowd of 97,939, played right- in the 7–2 victory over Wigan in the 1969–70 Challenge Cup Final during the 1969–70 season at Wembley Stadium, London on Saturday 9 May 1970, in front of a crowd of 95,2559, played right-, i.e. number 10, and was man of the match winning the Lance Todd Trophy in Hull Kingston Rovers' 10-5 victory over Hull F.C. in the 1979–80 Challenge Cup Final during the 1979–80 season at Wembley Stadium, London on Saturday 3 May 1980, in front of a crowd of 95,000, and played right- in Widnes' 18-9 victory over Hull Kingston Rovers in the 1980–81 Challenge Cup Final during the 1980–81 season at Wembley Stadium, London on Saturday 2 May 1981, in front of a crowd of 92,496, and played right- in the 14–14 draw with Hull F.C. in the 1981–82 Challenge Cup Final during the 1981–82 season at Wembley Stadium, London on Saturday 1 May 1982, in front of a crowd of 92,147, played right- in the 9-18 defeat by Hull F.C. in the 1981–82 Challenge Cup Final replay during the 1981–82 season at Elland Road, Leeds on Wednesday 19 May 1982, in front of a crowd of 41,171.

County Cup Final appearances
Brian Lockwood played right-, i.e. number 12, (replaced by  interchange/substitute Michael Redfearn) in Castleford's 11-22 defeat by Leeds in the 1968–69 Yorkshire County Cup Final during the 1968–69 season at Belle Vue, Wakefield on Saturday 19 October 1968, played right- in the 7-11 defeat by Hull Kingston Rovers in the 1971–72 Final during the 1971–72 season at Belle Vue, Wakefield on  Saturday 21 August 1971, and played right-, i.e. number 10, in Widnes' 3-8 defeat by Leigh in the 1981–82 Lancashire County Cup Final during the 1981–82 season at Central Park, Wigan on Saturday 26 September 1981.

BBC2 Floodlit Trophy Final appearances
Brian Lockwood played right-, i.e. number 10, in Hull Kingston Rovers' 3-13 defeat by Hull F.C. in the 1979 BBC2 Floodlit Trophy Final during the 1979–80 season at The Boulevard, Hull on Tuesday 18 December 1979.

Career in Australia
Lockwood moved to Sydney's Canterbury-Bankstown Bulldogs club in 1974, reaching the Grand Final with them that year. He later joined the Balmain Tigers, winning the 1976 Amco Cup Final with a famous inside pass to Neil Pringle for the match winning try

Coaching career

Club career
Brian Lockwood was the coach of Batley from November 1985 to May 1987.

Honoured at Castleford Tigers
Brian Lockwood is a Tigers Hall Of Fame Inductee.

Genealogical information
Brian Lockwood's marriage to Anne (née Stead) was registered during fourth ¼ 1967 in Barkston Ash district, he is the cousin of the rugby league footballer, and coach; Roger Millward.

References

External links
When Great Britain won the World Cup
Tracking down the heroes of 1972

1946 births
Living people
Balmain Tigers players
Batley Bulldogs coaches
Canterbury-Bankstown Bulldogs players
Castleford Tigers players
England national rugby league team captains
England national rugby league team players
English rugby league coaches
English rugby league players
Great Britain national rugby league team players
Huddersfield Giants coaches
Hull Kingston Rovers players
Lance Todd Trophy winners
Oldham R.L.F.C. players
Publicans
Rugby league props
Rugby league second-rows
Rugby league players from Yorkshire
Wakefield Trinity players
Wakefield Trinity coaches
Widnes Vikings players
Yorkshire rugby league team players